The Leeds City Council elections were held on Thursday, 5 May 1994, with one third of the council up for election, alongside a vacancy in the University ward.

Differing wildly from the previous election, the results were reminiscent of Labour's landslide in the 1990 election, often producing enormous swings. Although falling short of their 1990 vote, Labour were able to win just as comfortably, helped by a significant collapse in Conservative support to a party low and third place in vote. The Lib Dems, who had also suffered a sharp reduction in vote at the last election, gained their highest vote since the merger, and surpassed the Conservatives for the first time. The scale of the Conservative defeat seen another first with their ousting into fourth place in a number of wards by the Liberals and Greens - the latter receiving their strongest result yet, winning just under a fifth of the vote in Wortley.

With the seats last fought at the 1990 election, where the Labour tide had swept everywhere but the northern Conservative-Lib Dem heartlands, Labour's nearest attempt at a gain was found in Roundhay, with the party narrowing the Tory majority there to just 564 votes. The Lib Dems came closest, but despite running the Conservatives close in North ward and Labour in Pudsey South and Weetwood, they were unable to capitalise and steal a fourth seat. As a result, there were no change in seats.

Election result

This result has the following consequences for the total number of seats on the council after the elections:

Ward results

References

1994 English local elections
1994
1990s in Leeds